Superstar Challenge is a Canadian television game show franchise.

Shows 
 Designer Superstar Challenge  Superstar Challenge (2003-2006), hosted by Karen Bertelsen winner Karen Sealy 
 Handyman Superstar Challenge a.k.a. Superstar Handyman Challenge (2006-2010), hosted by Karen Bertelsen
 All American Handyman (2010-2012), hosted by Molly Culver
 Canada's Handyman Challenge (2012-2014), hosted by Jillian Harris and then Jennifer Robertson
 Superstar Chef Challenge (2005-2007), hosted by Kevin Brauch
 Superstar Hair Challenge (2006-2008), hosted by Karen Bertelsen

References 

2000s Canadian game shows